Barbourville is a home rule-class city in Knox County, Kentucky, in the United States. The population was 3,165 at the 2010 census, down from 3,589 at the 2000 census. It is the county seat of Knox County. The city was formally established by the state assembly in 1812. It was incorporated in 1854 and then reïncorporated in 1856.

Union College and the Appalachian Children's Home are located in Barbourville.

Geography
Barbourville is in the center of Knox County, in the valley of the Cumberland River where it is joined by Richland Creek. U.S. Route 25E passes through the east side of the city, leading northwest  to Corbin and southeast the same distance to Pineville.

Demographics

As of the census of 2000, there were 3,165 people, 1,211 households, and 662 families residing in the city. The racial makeup of the city was 94.40% White, 3.23% African American, 0.56% Native American, 0.25% Asian, 0.17% from other races, and 1.39% from two or more races. Hispanic or Latino of any race were 0.59% of the population.

There were 1,211 households, out of which 24.9% had children under the age of 18 living with them, 36.9% were married couples living together, 19.6% had a female householder with no husband present, and 40.9% were non-families. 37.8% of all households were made up of individuals, and 15.4% had someone living alone who was 65 years of age or older. The average household size was 2.18 and the average family size was 2.88.

In the city, the population was spread out, with 22.1% under the age of 18, 15.7% from 18 to 24, 24.7% from 25 to 44, 20.5% from 45 to 64, and 17.0% who were 65 years of age or older. The median age was 34 years. For every 100 females, there were 82.2 males. For every 100 females age 18 and over, there were 78.4 males.

The median income for a household in the city was $13,297, and the median income for a family was $20,762. Males had a median income of $31,775 versus $18,102 for females. The per capita income for the city was $11,485. About 32.6% of families and 38.0% of the population were below the poverty line, including 43.4% of those under age 18 and 30.5% of those age 65 or over.

Arts and culture
Each year in early October, Barbourville hosts the Daniel Boone Festival, commemorating the pioneer who explored the area in 1775. The festival features open-air concerts, carnival attractions, a beauty pageant, a parade, and other events.

Starting in 2005, the Southern and Eastern Kentucky Tourism Development Association began sponsoring the Springtime Redbud Festival. The Redbud Festival in April first featured a quilting workshop and now includes other traditions and crafts, including storytelling, art shows, dulcimer workshops, and a cooking school.

Voters in Barbourville in 2015 approved alcohol sales in the city after 82 years of prohibition established by local law in 1933. The measure won in a special election in December 2015, by a little more than 60 votes. This approval came three and a half years after voters rejected alcohol sales in another special election. The measure will allow alcohol sales in both stores and restaurants.

Education

Public schools
Public schools are administered by Knox County Public Schools.  Schools in Barbourville include:
 Central Elementary School
 G. R. Hampton Elementary School
 Jesse D. Lay Elementary School
 Knox County Middle School
 Knox Central High School
 Dewitt Elementary
 Girdler Elementary
 Flat Lick Elementary 
 Lynn Camp Schools

Independent schools
The Barbourville Independent School District administers Barbourville Elementary School and Barbourville High School.

Knox Appalachian School
The Knox Appalachian School is a public school serving the needs of the children committed to the Appalachian Children's Home.

Public library
Barbourville  has a lending library, the Knox County Public Library.

Notable people
 Green Adams, (1812–1884), born in Barbourville, U.S. congressman
 James D. Black (1849-1938), Kentucky governor (1919)
 Samuel Freeman Miller, U.S. Supreme Court justice
 James S. Golden, U.S. representative, 1949-1955
 John M. Robsion Jr., U.S. representative 1953-1959
 Flem D. Sampson, Kentucky governor (1927–1931)
 William A. Stanfill (1892-1971), U.S. senator (1945-1946)
 Kenneth H. Tuggle,  Lt. Governor of Kentucky (1943–1947)
 Silas Woodson, Missouri governor

References

Further reading
For a depiction of early Barbourville see: Michael A. Ross, "Hill Country Doctor: The Early Life and Career of Supreme Court Justice Samuel F. Miller in Kentucky, 1816–1849," The Filson History Quarterly, Vol. 71 (October 1997): 430–462.

External links
 

 
Cities in Kentucky
Cities in Knox County, Kentucky
County seats in Kentucky